Silvano Raganini (born 10 December 1943) is a Sammarinese former sports shooter. He competed at the 1972 Summer Olympics and the 1976 Summer Olympics.

References

1943 births
Living people
Sammarinese male sport shooters
Olympic shooters of San Marino
Shooters at the 1972 Summer Olympics
Shooters at the 1976 Summer Olympics
Place of birth missing (living people)